Mwele may refer to
Mwele Ntuli Malecela (born 1963), Director General of the Tanzanian National Institute for Medical Research
Mwele language, a minor Bantu language of Gabon
 Mwele River, a tributary of Mwenezi River